Tokoroa Aerodrome  is a public aerodrome owned by the South Waikato District Council and is located one nautical mile east-southeast of Tokoroa township in the Waikato region of New Zealand.

The airfield plays home to the Tokoroa and Districts Aero Club Inc. and a keen community of RC model aircraft flyers.

See also
Tokoroa Airfield website

 List of airports in New Zealand
 List of airlines of New Zealand
 Transport in New Zealand

References

 New Zealand AIP 4 AD
New Zealand AIP (PDF)

Airports in New Zealand
Tokoroa
Transport buildings and structures in Waikato